Hahnia glacialis is a species of true spider in the family Hahniidae. It is found in Russia (Sibiria) and North America.

References

Hahniidae
Articles created by Qbugbot
Spiders described in 1898